This is a list of listed buildings in Nyborg Municipality, Denmark.

Listed buildings

5540 Ullerslev

5800 Nyborg

5853 Ørbæk

References

External links

 Danish Agency of Culture

 
Nyborg